This is a comprehensive list of victories of the  cycling team. The races are categorized according to the UCI Continental Circuits rules.

2003 – Quick-Step–Davitamon

Antwerpen na-tour Dernyspektakel, Johan Museeuw
Criterium Bavikhoeve, Paolo Bettini
Acht van Chaam, Servais Knaven
Profronde van Heerlen, Servais Knaven
Mijl van Mares, Servais Knaven
Stage 5 Tour of Qatar, Servais Knaven
 Overall Tour Méditerranéen, Paolo Bettini
Omloop Het Nieuwsblad, Johan Museeuw
Milan–San Remo, Paolo Bettini
Stage 3 Tour de Romandie, Laurent Dufaux
Stage 1 Tour de Picardie, Aurelien Clerc
 Overall Tour de Belgique, Michael Rogers
Stage 3, Tom Boonen
 Overall Deutschland Tour, Michael Rogers
Stage 6, Michael Rogers
 Overall Route du Sud, Michael Rogers
Stage 3, Michael Rogers
 Road Race Championship, Paolo Bettini
 Road Race Championship, László Bodrogi
Stage 7 Tour de France, Richard Virenque
Stage 17 Tour de France, Servais Knaven
Vattenfall Cyclassics, Paolo Bettini
GP Stad Kortrijk, Frank Vandenbroucke
Clásica de San Sebastián, Paolo Bettini
Stage 3 Tour of Denmark, Johan Museeuw
G.P. Beghelli, Luca Paolini
 World Time Trial Championships, Michael Rogers
Nationale Sluitingprijs — Putte-Kapellen, Nick Nuyens

2004 – Quick-Step–Davitamon

Stage 2 Tour of Qatar, Tom Boonen
Stage 2 Tour Méditerranéen, Paolo Bettini
Stage 1 Vuelta a Andalucía, Tom Boonen
Stage 2 Paris–Nice, Pedro Horrillo
 Overall Tirreno–Adriatico, Paolo Bettini
Stage 4 & 6, Paolo Bettini
E3 Prijs Vlaanderen, Tom Boonen
Brabantse Pijl, Luca Paolini
Stage 4 Three Days of De Panne, László Bodrogi
Gent–Wevelgem, Tom Boonen
Scheldeprijs Vlaanderen, Tom Boonen
Stage 3 Giro del Trentino, Juan Miguel Mercado
 Overall Tour de Picardie, Tom Boonen
Stage 1 & 2, Tom Boonen
Stage 2 Tour of Belgium, Tom Boonen
 Overall Deutschland Tour, Patrik Sinkewitz
Stage 2 & 7, Tom Boonen
Stage 3, Patrik Sinkewitz
Stage 8 Tour de Suisse, Paolo Bettini
 Overall Ster Elektrotoer, Nick Nuyens
Prologue & Stage 1, Tom Boonen
Stage 3, Nick Nuyens
 Time Trial Championships, László Bodrogi
Stage 6 & 20 Tour de France, Tom Boonen
Stage 10 Tour de France, Richard Virenque
Stage 18 Tour de France, Juan Miguel Mercado
Stage 1 UNIQA Classic, Pedro Horrillo
Gran Premio Città di Camaiore, Paolo Bettini
Stage 4 Vuelta a Burgos, Aurélien Clerc
 Olympic Games, Road Race, Paolo Bettini
Stage 1 Tour of Britain, Stefano Zanini
Stage 3 Tour of Britain, Tom Boonen
Memorial Rik Van Steenbergen, Tom Boonen
Paris–Brussels, Nick Nuyens
Grand Prix de Wallonie, Nick Nuyens
Gran Premio Industria e Commercio di Prato, Nick Nuyens
Stage 1 Circuit Franco-Belge, Paolo Bettini
Stage 3 & 4 Circuit Franco-Belge, Tom Boonen
 World Time Trial Championships, Michael Rogers
Japan Cup, Patrik Sinkewitz

2005 – Quick-Step–Innergetic

Stage 1 & 2 Tour of Qatar, Tom Boonen
Omloop Het Volk, Nick Nuyens
Gran Premio di Lugano, Rik Verbrugghe
Stage 1 & 2 Paris–Nice, Tom Boonen
Stage 5 Tirreno Adriatico, Servais Knaven
E3 Prijs Vlaanderen, Tom Boonen
Tour of Flanders, Tom Boonen
Paris–Roubaix, Tom Boonen
Stage 1 Giro d'Italia, Paolo Bettini
Stage 2 Tour de Picardie, Tom Boonen
 Overall Tour of Belgium, Tom Boonen
Stage 1 & 2, Tom Boonen
Stage 2 & 3 Tour de France, Tom Boonen
 Overall Tour of Austria, Juan Miguel Mercado
Stage 2, Juan Miguel Mercado
Stage 3 Tour de Wallonie, Luca Paolini
Vattenfall Cyclassics, Filippo Pozzato
Prologue Eneco Tour, Rik Verbrugghe
Giro del Lazio, Filippo Pozzato
Stage 1 Tour de l'Ain, Cristian Moreni
Stage 1 Deutschland Tour, Bram Tankink
Stage 2 Deutschland Tour, Filippo Pozzato
 Overall Tour of Britain, Nick Nuyens
Stage 1 & 5, Nick Nuyens
Stage 3 & 6, Luca Paolini
Stage 16 Vuelta a España, Paolo Bettini
Grand Prix de Wallonie, Nick Nuyens
 World Time Trial Championships, Michael Rogers
 World Road Race Championships, Tom Boonen
Züri-Metzgete, Paolo Bettini
Giro di Lombardia, Paolo Bettini

2006 – Quick-Step–Innergetic

Doha GP, Tom Boonen
 Overall Tour of Qatar, Tom Boonen
Stage 1, 2, 3 & 5, Tom Boonen
Trofeo Soller, Paolo Bettini
Stage 5 Vuelta a Andalucía, Tom Boonen
Gran Premio di Chiasso, Remmert Wielinga
Gran Premio di Lugano, Paolo Bettini
Kuurne–Brussels–Kuurne, Nick Nuyens
Stage 1 Driedaagse van West-Vlaanderen, Francesco Chicchi
Stage 1, 2 & 4 Paris–Nice, Tom Boonen
Stage 1 & 2 Tirreno–Adriatico, Paolo Bettini
Milan–San Remo, Filippo Pozzato
E3 Prijs Vlaanderen, Tom Boonen
Stage 3 Three Days of the Panne, Steven de Jongh
Tour of Flanders, Tom Boonen
Scheldeprijs Vlaanderen, Tom Boonen
Stage 1 Four Days of Dunkirk, Francesco Chicchi
Stage 15 Giro d'Italia, Paolo Bettini
Stage 19 Giro d'Italia, Juan Manuel Gárate
Stage 2 & 3b Tour of Belgium, Tom Boonen
Veenendaal–Veenendaal, Tom Boonen
Stage 1 Tour de Suisse, Tom Boonen
Stage 3 Tour de Suisse, Nick Nuyens
 Road Race Championship, Paolo Bettini
Stage 18 Tour de France, Matteo Tosatto
Stage 1, 3 & 5 Eneco Tour, Tom Boonen
Stage 2 Vuelta a España, Paolo Bettini
Stage 3 Tour of Britain, Filippo Pozzato
Stage 5 Tour of Britain, Francesco Chicchi
Stage 6 Tour of Britain, Tom Boonen
Grand Prix d'Isbergues, Cédric Vasseur
Delta Profronde, Steven de Jongh
 World Road Race Championships, Paolo Bettini
 Overall Circuit Franco-Belge, Kevin Van Impe
Stage 1, Kevin Van Impe
Giro di Lombardia, Paolo Bettini

2007 – Quick-Step–Innergetic

 Overall Tour of Qatar, Wilfried Cretskens
Stage 1 Team Time Trial
Stage 2, 3, 4 & 6, Tom Boonen
Stage 4 Vuelta a Andalucía, Tom Boonen
Stage 1 Volta ao Algarve, Gert Steegmans
Stage 4 Tour of California, Paolo Bettini
Kuurne–Brussels–Kuurne, Tom Boonen
Stage 3 Driedaagse van West-Vlaanderen, Wouter Weylandt
Ronde van het Groene Hart, Wouter Weylandt
Dwars door Vlaanderen, Tom Boonen
E3 Prijs Vlaanderen, Tom Boonen
Stage 3 Driedaagse van De Panne, Gert Steegmans
Stage 4 Four Days of Dunkirk, Gert Steegmans
Stage 1 Tour of Belgium, Wouter Weylandt
Stage 5 Tour of Belgium, Tom Boonen
Stage 2 Tour de Suisse, Alessandro Proni
Stage 1 Ster Elektrotoer, Wouter Weylandt
 Road Race Championship, Giovanni Visconti
 Points classification, Tour de France, Tom Boonen
Stage 2, Gert Steegmans
Stage 6 & 12, Tom Boonen
Stage 10, Cédric Vasseur
Stage 2a Brixia Tour, Giovanni Visconti
Clásica de San Sebastián, Juan Manuel Gárate
Stage 4 Eneco Tour, Wouter Weylandt
Stage 7 Eneco Tour, Sébastien Rosseler
Grote Prijs Jef Scherens, Bram Tankink
Stage 3 Vuelta a España, Paolo Bettini
Tour de Rijke, Gert Steegmans
Omloop van het Houtland, Steven de Jongh
 World Road Race Championships, Paolo Bettini
Omloop van de Vlaamse Scheldeboorden, Steven de Jongh
 Overall Circuit Franco-Belge, Gert Steegmans
Stage 2 & 4, Gert Steegmans
Coppa Sabatini, Giovanni Visconti

2008 – Quick-Step

 Overall Tour of Qatar, Tom Boonen
Team Time Trial
Stage 2, 3 & 6, Tom Boonen
Trofeo Calvià, Gert Steegmans
Stage 3 Vuelta a Andalucía, Giovanni Visconti
Stage 2 Tour of California, Tom Boonen
 Overall Volta ao Algarve, Stijn Devolder
Stage 4, Stijn Devolder
Kuurne–Brussels–Kuurne, Steven de Jongh
Stage 1 & 2 Paris–Nice, Gert Steegmans
Nokere Koerse, Wouter Weylandt
Tour of Flanders, Stijn Devolder
Paris–Roubaix, Tom Boonen
Stage 2 Four Days of Dunkirk, Gert Steegmans
Profronde van Fryslan, Gert Steegmans
 Overall Tour of Belgium, Stijn Devolder
Stage 4, Stijn Devolder
Stage 5, Tom Boonen
Stage 4 Ster Elektrotoer, Tom Boonen
Halle–Ingooigem, Gert Steegmans
Stage 1 Tour of Austria, Paolo Bettini
Stage 7 Tour of Austria, Tom Boonen
Trofeo Matteotti, Paolo Bettini
Stage 21 Tour de France, Gert Steegmans
Stage 1 Tour de Wallonie, Tom Boonen
Stage 2 Tour de Wallonie, Paolo Bettini
 Time Trial Championship, Stijn Devolder
Stage 1 & 4 Eneco Tour, Tom Boonen
Tour de Rijke, Steven de Jongh
Stage 3 & 16 Vuelta a España, Tom Boonen
Stage 6 & 12 Vuelta a España, Paolo Bettini
Stage 17 Vuelta a España, Wouter Weylandt
Memorial Rik Van Steenbergen, Gert Steegmans
Grand Prix de Fourmies, Giovanni Visconti
Stage 2 Tour de Pologne, Allan Davis
Omloop van de Vlaamse Scheldeboorden, Wouter Weylandt
Stage 1 Circuit Franco-Belge, Tom Boonen
Stage 4 Circuit Franco-Belge, Sébastien Rosseler

2009 – Quick-Step

 Overall Tour Down Under, Allan Davis
Stage 2, 4 & 5, Allan Davis
 Overall Tour of Qatar, Tom Boonen
Stage 3, Tom Boonen
Kuurne–Brussels–Kuurne, Tom Boonen
Le Samyn, Wouter Weylandt
Stage 3 Driedaagse van West-Vlaanderen, Wouter Weylandt
Stage 3 Paris–Nice, Sylvain Chavanel
Dwars door Vlaanderen, Kevin Van Impe
Tour of Flanders, Stijn Devolder
Paris–Roubaix, Tom Boonen
Stage 4 Four Days of Dunkirk, Sébastien Rosseler
 Giro d'Italia, Youth classification, Kevin Seeldraeyers
Stage 5 Tour of Belgium, Sébastien Rosseler
Halle–Ingooigem, Jurgen Van De Walle
 Time Trial Championship, Branislau Samoilau
 Road Race Championship, Tom Boonen
Stage 5 Tour of Austria, Dries Devenyns
Prologue Eneco Tour, Sylvain Chavanel
Stage 3 Eneco Tour, Tom Boonen
Kampioenschap van Vlaanderen, Steven de Jongh
Stage 3 Circuit Franco-Belge, Tom Boonen

2010 – Quick-Step

Stage 3 & 5 Tour of Qatar, Tom Boonen
Stage 5 Tour of Oman, Tom Boonen
Stage 2 Tirreno–Adriatico, Tom Boonen
Stage 5 Volta a Catalunya, Davide Malacarne
Stage 3 Giro d'Italia, Wouter Weylandt
Stage 5 Giro d'Italia, Jérôme Pineau
 Overall Tour of Belgium, Stijn Devolder
Halle–Ingooigem, Jurgen Van De Walle
Stage 2 & 7 Tour de France, Sylvain Chavanel
 Time Trial Championships, Branislau Samoilau
 Road Race Championships, Stijn Devolder
 Time Trial Championships, Stijn Devolder
Gran Premio Bruno Beghelli, Dario Cataldo

2011 – Quick-Step

 Cyclo-cross World Championships, Zdeněk Štybar
Stage 2 Tour of Qatar, Tom Boonen
Nokere Koerse, Gert Steegmans
Gent–Wevelgem, Tom Boonen
 Road Race Championships, Sylvain Chavanel
 Road Race Championships, Marc de Maar
 Time Trial Championships, Marc de Maar

2012 – Omega Pharma–Quick-Step

 Cyclocross Championships, Zdeněk Štybar
 Overall Tour de San Luis, Levi Leipheimer
Stages 1 & 2, Francesco Chicchi
Stages 3 & 4, Levi Leipheimer
Stage 7, Tom Boonen
 Overall Tour of Qatar, Tom Boonen
Stages 1 & 4, Tom Boonen
Trofeo Palma, Andrew Fenn
Trofeo Migjorn, Andrew Fenn
Stage 4 Volta ao Algarve, Gerald Ciolek
 Overall Tour of Oman, Peter Velits
 Overall Driedaagse van West-Vlaanderen, Julien Vermote
Prologue, Michał Kwiatkowski
Stage 1, Francesco Chicchi
Stage 2 Paris–Nice, Tom Boonen
Nokere Koerse, Francesco Chicchi
Handzame Classic, Francesco Chicchi
Dwars door Vlaanderen, Niki Terpstra
E3 Harelbeke, Tom Boonen
Gent–Wevelgem, Tom Boonen
 Overall Three Days of De Panne, Sylvain Chavanel
Stage 3b (ITT), Sylvain Chavanel
Tour of Flanders, Tom Boonen
Paris–Roubaix, Tom Boonen
Stage 7 Tour of Turkey, Iljo Keisse
Stage 4 Four Days of Dunkirk, Zdeněk Štybar
 Overall Tour of Belgium, Tony Martin
Stage 4 (ITT), Tony Martin
 Time Trial Championships, Sylvain Chavanel
 Time Trial Championships, Tony Martin
 Time Trial Championships, Peter Velits
 Time Trial Championships, Dario Cataldo
 Time Trial Championships, Kristof Vandewalle
 Road Race Championships, Tom Boonen
 Road Race Championships, Matt Brammeier
 Road Race Championships, Niki Terpstra
 Road Race Championships, Michał Gołaś
Stage 3 Tour de Pologne, Zdeněk Štybar
Stage 2b Tour de l'Ain, Team Time Trial
Stage 6 Tour of Utah, Levi Leipheimer
 Overall World Ports Classic, Tom Boonen
Stage 1, Tom Boonen
Stage 16 Vuelta a España, Dario Cataldo
Paris–Brussels, Tom Boonen
 World Team Time Trial Championships
 World Time Trial Championships, Tony Martin
 Overall Tour of Beijing, Tony Martin
Stage 2, Tony Martin
Chrono des Nations, Tony Martin
Amstel Curaçao Race, Niki Terpstra

2013 – Omega Pharma–Quick-Step

 Cyclocross Championships, Zdeněk Štybar
Stage 1 Tour de San Luis, Mark Cavendish
 Overall Tour of Qatar, Mark Cavendish
Stages 3, 4, 5 & 6, Mark Cavendish
 Overall Volta ao Algarve, Tony Martin
Stage 4 (ITT), Tony Martin
 Overall Driedaagse van West-Vlaanderen, Kristof Vandewalle
Prologue, Kristof Vandewalle
Stage 1 Tirreno–Adriatico, Team Time Trial
Stage 6 Paris–Nice, Sylvain Chavanel
Stage 7 (ITT) Tirreno–Adriatico, Tony Martin
Stages 1 & 2 Volta a Catalunya, Gianni Meersman
 Overall Three Days of De Panne, Sylvain Chavanel
Stage 2, Mark Cavendish
Stage 3b (ITT), Sylvain Chavanel
Stage 6 (ITT) Tour of the Basque Country, Tony Martin
Stages 1 & 3 Tour de Romandie, Gianni Meersman
Stage 5 (ITT) Tour de Romandie, Tony Martin
Stages 1, 6, 12, 13 & 21 Giro d'Italia, Mark Cavendish
 Points classification in the Giro d'Italia, Mark Cavendish
 Overall Tour of Belgium, Tony Martin
Stage 3 (ITT), Tony Martin
Stage 4 (ITT) Critérium du Dauphiné, Tony Martin
 Time Trial Championships, Sylvain Chavanel
 Time Trial Championships, Tony Martin
 Time Trial Championships, Peter Velits
 Road Race Championships, Michał Kwiatkowski
 Road Race Championships, Mark Cavendish
Stages 5 & 13 Tour de France, Mark Cavendish
Stage 11 (ITT) Tour de France, Tony Martin
Stage 14 Tour de France, Matteo Trentin
Stage 2 Tour de Wallonie, Tom Boonen
Stage 6 Danmark Rundt, Mark Cavendish
Prologue Tour de l'Ain, Gianni Meersman
 Time Trial Championships, Kristof Vandewalle
 Overall Eneco Tour, Zdeněk Štybar
Stages 3 & 7, Zdeněk Štybar
Stage 5 (ITT), Sylvain Chavanel
Stage 7 Vuelta a España, Zdeněk Štybar
 Overall World Ports Classic, Nikolas Maes
Stages 4, 7 & 8 Tour of Britain, Mark Cavendish
 World Team Time Trial Championships
 World Time Trial Championships, Tony Martin
Chrono des Nations, Tony Martin

2014 – Omega Pharma–Quick-Step

Rotterdam Six Days, Niki Terpstra & Iljo Keisse
 Cyclo-cross World Championships, Zdeněk Štybar
 Overall Tour of Qatar, Niki Terpstra
Stage 1, Niki Terpstra
Stages 2 & 4, Tom Boonen
Trofeo Serra de Tramuntana, Michał Kwiatkowski
Trofeo Muro-Port d'Alcúdia, Gianni Meersman
 Overall Volta ao Algarve, Michał Kwiatkowski
Stages 2 & 3 (ITT), Michał Kwiatkowski
Stage 5, Mark Cavendish
Kuurne–Brussels–Kuurne, Tom Boonen
Strade Bianche, Michał Kwiatkowski
Stage 2 Driedaagse van West-Vlaanderen, Guillaume Van Keirsbulck
Stage 1 Tirreno–Adriatico, Team time trial
Stage 6 Tirreno–Adriatico, Mark Cavendish
Dwars door Vlaanderen, Niki Terpstra
 Overall Three Days of De Panne, Guillaume Van Keirsbulck
Stages 2 & 6 (ITT) Tour of the Basque Country, Tony Martin
Stage 4 Tour of the Basque Country, Wout Poels
Grand Prix Pino Cerami, Alessandro Petacchi
Paris–Roubaix, Niki Terpstra
Stages 1, 2, 4 & 8 Tour of Turkey, Mark Cavendish
Prologue (ITT) Tour de Romandie, Michał Kwiatkowski
Stages 1 & 8 Tour of California, Mark Cavendish
Stage 12 (ITT) Giro d'Italia, Rigoberto Urán
 Overall Tour of Belgium, Tony Martin
Stages 1 & 2, Tom Boonen
Stage 3 (ITT), Tony Martin
Stage 6 Critérium du Dauphiné, Jan Bakelants
Stages 1 (ITT) & 7 (ITT) Tour de Suisse, Tony Martin
Stage 4 Tour de Suisse, Mark Cavendish
Stage 6 Tour de Suisse, Matteo Trentin
 Time Trial Championships, Michał Kwiatkowski
 Time Trial Championships, Tony Martin
 Road Race Championships,  Zdeněk Štybar
World University Cycling Championship Road Race, Petr Vakoč
World University Cycling Championship Time Trial, Petr Vakoč
Stages 7 Tour de France, Matteo Trentin
Stages 9 & 20 (ITT) Tour de France, Tony Martin
 Overall Tour de Wallonie, Gianni Meersman
Stage 5, Gianni Meersman
Stage 2 Tour de Pologne, Petr Vakoč
Stage 2 Eneco Tour, Zdeněk Štybar
Stage 7 Eneco Tour, Guillaume Van Keirsbulck
Prologue & Stage 2 Tour de l'Ain, Gianni Meersman
Stage 4 Tour de l'Ain, Julian Alaphilippe
Châteauroux Classic, Iljo Keisse
Stages 1 & 2 Tour du Poitou-Charentes, Mark Cavendish
Stage 10 (ITT) Vuelta a España, Tony Martin
Stage 2 Tour of Britain, Mark Renshaw
Stage 4 Tour of Britain, Michał Kwiatkowski
Stage 7 Tour of Britain, Julien Vermote
GP Briek Schotte, Andrew Fenn
 World Road Race Championships, Michał Kwiatkowski
Binche–Chimay–Binche, Zdeněk Štybar
Amstel Curaçao Race, Niki Terpstra

2015 – Etixx–Quick-Step

Rotterdam Six Days, Niki Terpstra & Iljo Keisse
Stage 7 Tour de San Luis, Mark Cavendish
Cadel Evans Great Ocean Road Race, Gianni Meersman
 Overall Dubai Tour, Mark Cavendish
Stages 1 & 4, Mark Cavendish
 Time Trial Championships, Rigoberto Urán
 Overall Tour of Qatar, Niki Terpstra
Stage 3 (ITT), Niki Terpstra
Clásica de Almería, Mark Cavendish
Stage 1 Volta ao Algarve, Gianni Meersman
Stage 3 (ITT) Volta ao Algarve, Tony Martin
Kuurne–Brussels–Kuurne, Mark Cavendish
Strade Bianche, Zdeněk Štybar
 Overall Driedaagse van West-Vlaanderen, Yves Lampaert
Stage 1, Yves Lampaert
Prologue Paris–Nice, Michał Kwiatkowski
Handzame Classic, Gianni Meersman
Ronde van Zeeland Seaports, Iljo Keisse
Amstel Gold Race, Michał Kwiatkowski
Stages 1, 2 & 7 Presidential Cycling Tour of Turkey, Mark Cavendish
Stage 6 (ITT) Tour de Romandie, Tony Martin
Stages 1, 2, 5 & 8 Tour of California, Mark Cavendish
Stage 7 Tour of California, Julian Alaphilippe
Stage 1 Tour of Belgium, Tom Boonen
Stage 21 Giro d'Italia, Iljo Keisse
Rund um Köln, Tom Boonen
 Time Trial Championships, Tony Martin
 Road Race Championships, Petr Vakoč
 Road Race Championships, Niki Terpstra
Stage 4 Tour de France, Tony Martin
Stage 6 Tour de France, Zdeněk Štybar
Stage 7 Tour de France, Mark Cavendish
 Overall Tour de Wallonie, Niki Terpstra
Stage 1, Niki Terpstra
Stage 3 Eneco Tour, Tom Boonen
 Overall Czech Cycling Tour, Petr Vakoč
Stage 1, Team time trial
Stage 2, Fernando Gaviria
Stage 4, Zdeněk Štybar
 Overall Tour du Poitou-Charentes, Tony Martin
Stages 2 & 5, Matteo Trentin
Stage 2 Tour of Britain, Petr Vakoč
Stage 4 Tour of Britain, Fernando Gaviria
Stage 6 Tour of Britain, Matteo Trentin
Grand Prix Cycliste de Québec, Rigoberto Urán
Kampioenschap van Vlaanderen, Michał Gołaś
Münsterland Giro, Tom Boonen
Paris–Tours, Matteo Trentin

2016 – Etixx–Quick-Step

Stage 1 (TTT) Tour de San Luis
Stage 2 Tour de San Luis, Fernando Gaviria
Trofeo Pollenca-Port de Andratx, Gianluca Brambilla
 Overall Dubai Tour, Marcel Kittel
Stages 1 & 4, Marcel Kittel
Stage 2 Volta a la Comunitat Valenciana, Dan Martin
Stage 5 Volta a la Comunitat Valenciana, Stijn Vandenbergh
Stage 1 Tour of Oman, Bob Jungels
Stages 1 & 4 Volta ao Algarve, Marcel Kittel
Stage 2, Davide Martinelli, Tour La Provence
Stage 3, Fernando Gaviria, Tour La Provence
Classic Sud-Ardèche, Petr Vakoč
La Drôme Classic, Petr Vakoč
Le Samyn, Niki Terpstra
 Track Cycling World Championships – Omnium, Fernando Gaviria
Stage 2 Tirreno–Adriatico, Zdeněk Štybar
Stage 3 Tirreno–Adriatico, Fernando Gaviria
Stage 3 Volta a Catalunya, Dan Martin
Stage 3a Three Days of De Panne, Marcel Kittel
Scheldeprijs, Marcel Kittel
Brabantse Pijl, Petr Vakoč
Stage 1 Tour de Romandie, Marcel Kittel
Stages 2 & 3 Giro d'Italia, Marcel Kittel
Stage 8 Giro d'Italia, Gianluca Brambilla
 Youth classification Giro d'Italia, Bob Jungels
 Overall Tour of California, Julian Alaphilippe
Stage 3, Julian Alaphilippe
Stage 18 Giro d'Italia, Matteo Trentin
Stage 4 Tour de Suisse, Maximiliano Richeze
 Time Trial Championships, Tony Martin
 Time Trial Championships, Bob Jungels
 Road Race Championships, Bob Jungels
Stage 4 Tour de France, Marcel Kittel
Stage 1 Tour de Pologne, Davide Martinelli
Stages 2 & 4 Tour de Pologne, Fernando Gaviria
Stage 1 Tour de Wallonie, Tom Boonen
Stage 4 Tour de Wallonie, Matteo Trentin
London–Surrey Classic, Tom Boonen
Dwars door het Hageland, Niki Terpstra
Stage 1 Tour de l'Ain, Matteo Trentin
Stages 2 & 5 Vuelta a España, Gianni Meersman
Stage 9 Vuelta a España, David de la Cruz
Brussels Cycling Classic, Tom Boonen
Grand Prix de Fourmies, Marcel Kittel
Stage 15 Vuelta a España, Gianluca Brambilla
Stage 2 Tour of Britain, Julien Vermote
Stage 7a (ITT) Tour of Britain, Tony Martin
GP Impanis-Van Petegem, Fernando Gaviria
Textielprijs Vichte, Julien Vermote
 Overall Eneco Tour, Niki Terpstra
UCI Road World Championships – Men's team time trial
Paris–Tours, Fernando Gaviria
 UCI World Time Trial Championships, Tony Martin

2017 – Quick-Step Floors

 Time Trial Championships, Jack Bauer
Stages 1 & 4 Vuelta a San Juan, Fernando Gaviria
Stage 2 Vuelta a San Juan, Tom Boonen
Stages 6 & 7 Vuelta a San Juan, Maximiliano Richeze
 Overall Dubai Tour, Marcel Kittel
Stages 1, 2 & 5
Stage 1 Volta ao Algarve, Fernando Gaviria
Stage 2 Volta ao Algarve, Dan Martin
Stage 2 Abu Dhabi Tour, Marcel Kittel
Stage 4 (ITT) Paris–Nice, Julian Alaphilippe
Stage 8 Paris–Nice, David de la Cruz
Stage 6 Tirreno–Adriatico, Fernando Gaviria
Dwars door Vlaanderen, Yves Lampaert
  Overall Three Days of De Panne, Philippe Gilbert
Stage 1, Philippe Gilbert
Stage 3a, Marcel Kittel
Tour of Flanders, Philippe Gilbert
Scheldeprijs, Marcel Kittel
Stage 3 Tour of the Basque Country, David de la Cruz
Amstel Gold Race, Philippe Gilbert
Stages 3, 5, 12 & 13 Giro d'Italia, Fernando Gaviria
Stage 1 Tour of California, Marcel Kittel
Stage 15 Giro d'Italia, Bob Jungels
 Youth classification Giro d'Italia, Bob Jungels
 Points classification Giro d'Italia, Fernando Gaviria
Gullegem Koerse, Yves Lampaert
Stage 2 Tour de Suisse, Philippe Gilbert
Stage 4 Ster ZLM Toer, Marcel Kittel
 Time Trial Championships, Yves Lampaert
 Road Race Championships, Zdeněk Štybar
 Road Race Championships, Bob Jungels
Stages 2, 6, 7, 10 & 11 Tour de France, Marcel Kittel
Stage 2 Vuelta a Burgos, Matteo Trentin
Stage 2 Vuelta a España, Yves Lampaert
Stages 4, 10, 13 & 21 Vuelta a España, Matteo Trentin
Stage 8 Vuelta a España, Julian Alaphilippe
Omloop Mandel-Leie-Schelde, Iljo Keisse
Stage 4 Tour of Britain, Fernando Gaviria
Kampioenschap van Vlaanderen, Fernando Gaviria
GP Impanis-Van Petegem, Matteo Trentin
Textielprijs Vichte, Iljo Keisse
Paris–Tours, Matteo Trentin
Stages 1, 2, 3 & 6 Tour of Guangxi, Fernando Gaviria

2018 – Quick-Step Floors

Stage 3 Tour Down Under, Elia Viviani
Stage 1 Vuelta a San Juan, Fernando Gaviria
Stage 4 Vuelta a San Juan, Maximiliano Richeze
Stages 1, 2 & 3 Colombia Oro y Paz, Fernando Gaviria
 Overall Dubai Tour, Elia Viviani
Stages 2 & 5, Elia Viviani
Stage 4 Colombia Oro y Paz, Julian Alaphilippe
Stage 2 Abu Dhabi Tour, Elia Viviani
Le Samyn, Niki Terpstra
Dwars door West-Vlaanderen, Rémi Cavagna
Nokere Koerse, Fabio Jakobsen
Handzame Classic, Álvaro José Hodeg
Stage 1 Volta a Catalunya, Álvaro José Hodeg
Driedaagse De Panne-Koksijde, Elia Viviani
E3 Harelbeke, Niki Terpstra
Stage 6 Volta a Catalunya, Maximilian Schachmann
Dwars door Vlaanderen, Yves Lampaert
Tour of Flanders, Niki Terpstra
Stages 1 & 2 Tour of the Basque Country, Julian Alaphilippe
Scheldeprijs, Fabio Jakobsen
Stage 6 Tour of the Basque Country, Enric Mas
La Flèche Wallonne, Julian Alaphilippe
Liège–Bastogne–Liège, Bob Jungels
 Points classification Giro d'Italia, Elia Viviani
Stages 2, 3, 13 & 17, Elia Viviani
Stages 1, 5 & 7 Tour of California, Fernando Gaviria
Stage 1 Tour des Fjords, Fabio Jakobsen
Stage 18 Giro d'Italia, Maximilian Schachmann
Hammer Series Limburg
Stage 4 Critérium du Dauphiné, Julian Alaphilippe
Stage 1 (TTT) Adriatica Ionica Race
Stages 2, 4 & 5 Adriatica Ionica Race, Elia Viviani
 Road Race Championships, Yves Lampaert
 Time Trial Championships, Bob Jungels
 Road Race Championships, Elia Viviani
 Road Race Championships, Michael Mørkøv
 Road Race Championships, Bob Jungels
 Mountains classification Tour de France, Julian Alaphilippe
Stages 1 & 4, Fernando Gaviria
Stages 10 & 16, Julian Alaphilippe
Clásica de San Sebastián, Julian Alaphilippe
Stage 3 Tour de Pologne, Álvaro José Hodeg
Stage 1 BinckBank Tour, Fabio Jakobsen
EuroEyes Cyclassics, Elia Viviani
Stage 1 Deutschland Tour, Álvaro José Hodeg
Stage 2 Deutschland Tour, Maximilian Schachmann
Stages 3, 10 & 21 Vuelta a España, Elia Viviani
Stage 20 Vuelta a España, Enric Mas
 Overall Tour of Britain, Julian Alaphilippe
Stage 3, Julian Alaphilippe
 Overall Okolo Slovenska, Julian Alaphilippe
Prologue, Bob Jungels
Stage 1, Julian Alaphilippe
Stage 4, Fabio Jakobsen
Textielprijs Vichte, Florian Sénéchal
Grand Prix d'Isbergues, Philippe Gilbert
UCI Road World Championships – Men's team time trial
Stage 1 Tour of Turkey, Maximiliano Richeze
Stage 5 Tour of Turkey, Álvaro José Hodeg
Stages 3 & 6 Tour of Guangxi, Fabio Jakobsen
Six Days of Ghent, Iljo Keisse & Elia Viviani

2019 – Deceuninck–Quick-Step

Stage 1 Tour Down Under, Elia Viviani
Six Days of Bremen, Iljo Keisse
Cadel Evans Great Ocean Road Race, Elia Viviani
Stages 2 & 3 (ITT) Vuelta a San Juan, Julian Alaphilippe
Stage 2 Tour Colombia, Álvaro José Hodeg
Stage 4 Tour Colombia, Bob Jungels
Stage 5 Tour Colombia, Julian Alaphilippe
Stage 3 Tour La Provence, Philippe Gilbert
Stage 1 Volta ao Algarve, Fabio Jakobsen
Stage 5 Volta ao Algarve, Zdeněk Štybar
Stage 5 UAE Tour, Elia Viviani
Omloop Het Nieuwsblad, Zdeněk Štybar
Kuurne–Brussels–Kuurne, Bob Jungels
Le Samyn, Florian Sénéchal
Strade Bianche, Julian Alaphilippe
Stages 2 & 6 Tirreno–Adriatico, Julian Alaphilippe
Stage 3 Tirreno–Adriatico, Elia Viviani
Milan–San Remo, Julian Alaphilippe
E3 BinckBank Classic, Zdeněk Štybar
Stage 2 Tour of the Basque Country, Julian Alaphilippe
Scheldeprijs, Fabio Jakobsen
Paris–Roubaix, Philippe Gilbert
Stage 3 Tour of Turkey, Fabio Jakobsen
La Flèche Wallonne, Julian Alaphilippe
 Road Race Championships, Maximiliano Richeze
Stage 2 Tour of California, Kasper Asgreen
Stage 3 Tour of California, Rémi Cavagna
Stage 4 Tour of California, Fabio Jakobsen
Stage 2 Hammer Stavanger
Stage 2 Tour of Norway, Álvaro José Hodeg
Overall  Hammer Limburg 
Stages 1 & 2
 Overall Tour of Belgium, Remco Evenepoel
Stage 2, Remco Evenepoel
Stage 6 Critérium du Dauphiné, Julian Alaphilippe
Stages 4 & 5 Tour de Suisse, Elia Viviani
Stages 8 (ITT) Tour de Suisse, Yves Lampaert
Heylen Vastgoed Heistse Pijl, Álvaro José Hodeg
 Time Trial Championships, Kasper Asgreen
 Road Race Championships, Michael Mørkøv
 Time Trial Championships, Bob Jungels
 Road Race Championships, Bob Jungels
 Road Race Championships, Fabio Jakobsen
Stages 3 & 13 (ITT) Tour de France, Julian Alaphilippe
Stage 4 Tour de France, Elia Viviani
Stage 1 Adriatica Ionica Race, Álvaro José Hodeg
Stage 3 Adriatica Ionica Race, Remco Evenepoel
Clásica de San Sebastián, Remco Evenepoel
Prudential RideLondon-Surrey Classic, Elia Viviani
 UEC European Time Trial Championships, Remco Evenepoel
Pan American Games Road Race Championships, Maximiliano Richeze
 UEC European Road Championships, Elia Viviani
Stage 5 BinckBank Tour, Álvaro José Hodeg
EuroEyes Cyclassics Hamburg, Elia Viviani
Stages 4 & 21 Vuelta a España, Fabio Jakobsen
Stage 3 Deutschland Tour, Kasper Asgreen
Stages 12 & 17 Vuelta a España, Philippe Gilbert
Stage 19 Vuelta a España, Rémi Cavagna
Kampioenschap van Vlaanderen, Jannik Steimle
Overall Okolo Slovenska, Yves Lampaert
Stage 4, Elia Viviani
Sparkassen Münsterland Giro, Álvaro José Hodeg
 UEC European Track Championships – Madison, Michael Mørkøv
Six Days of London, Elia Viviani
 UEC European Track Championships – Elimination Race, Elia Viviani
 National Track Championships – Omnium, Elia Viviani

2020 – Deceuninck–Quick-Step

Stage 1 Tour Down Under, Sam Bennett
 Overall Vuelta a San Juan, Remco Evenepoel
Stage 3 (ITT), Remco Evenepoel
Stage 6 Vuelta a San Juan, Zdeněk Štybar
Race Torquay, Sam Bennett
Cadel Evans Great Ocean Road Race, Dries Devenyns
Stage 5 Volta a la Comunitat Valenciana, Fabio Jakobsen 
 Road Race Championships, Shane Archbold
 Overall Volta ao Algarve, Remco Evenepoel
Stage 1, Fabio Jakobsen
Stages 2 & 5 (ITT), Remco Evenepoel
Classic Sud-Ardèche, Rémi Cavagna
Kuurne–Brussels–Kuurne, Kasper Asgreen
Grote Prijs Jean-Pierre Monseré, Fabio Jakobsen 
 Overall Vuelta a Burgos, Remco Evenepoel
Stage 3, Remco Evenepoel
Stage 4, Sam Bennett
 Overall Tour de Pologne, Remco Evenepoel
Stage 1, Fabio Jakobsen 
Stage 4, Remco Evenepoel
Stage 5, Davide Ballerini
Stage 1 Tour de l'Ain, Andrea Bagioli
Stage 3 Tour de Wallonie, Sam Bennett
 Time Trial Championships, Bob Jungels
 Time Trial Championships, Rémi Cavagna
 Road Race Championships, Kasper Asgreen
Druivenkoers Overijse, Florian Sénéchal
Stage 1b (TTT) Settimana Internazionale di Coppi e Bartali
Stage 2 Settimana Internazionale di Coppi e Bartali, Andrea Bagioli
 Points classification, Tour de France, Sam Bennett
Stage 2, Julian Alaphilippe
Stages 10 & 21, Sam Bennett
 Overall Okolo Slovenska, Jannik Steimle
Stage 1b (ITT), Jannik Steimle
World Road Race Championships, Julian Alaphilippe
 Time Trial Championships, Kasper Asgreen
Brabantse Pijl, Julian Alaphilippe
Three Days of Bruges–De Panne, Yves Lampaert
Stage 4 Vuelta a España, Sam Bennett

2021 – Deceuninck–Quick-Step

Stages 1 & 2 Tour de la Provence, Davide Ballerini
Stages 4 & 6 UAE Tour, Sam Bennett
Omloop Het Nieuwsblad, Davide Ballerini
La Drôme Classic, Andrea Bagioli
GP Industria & Artigianato di Larciano, Mauri Vansevenant
Stages 1 & 5 Paris–Nice, Sam Bennett
Stage 2 Tirreno–Adriatico, Julian Alaphilippe
Classic Brugge–De Panne, Sam Bennett
E3 Saxo Bank Classic, Kasper Asgreen
Stage 5, Settimana Internazionale di Coppi e Bartali, Mikkel Frølich Honoré
Tour of Flanders, Kasper Asgreen
Stage 5 Tour of the Basque Country, Mikkel Frølich Honoré
Stages 2, 3, 4 & 8 Presidential Tour of Turkey, Mark Cavendish
La Flèche Wallonne, Julian Alaphilippe
Stage 5 (ITT) Tour de Romandie, Rémi Cavagna
Stages 1 & 3 Volta ao Algarve, Sam Bennett
Stage 4 (ITT) Volta ao Algarve, Kasper Asgreen
 Overall Tour of Belgium, Remco Evenepoel
Stage 2 (ITT), Remco Evenepoel
Stage 5, Mark Cavendish
 Time Trial Championships, Yves Lampaert
 Time Trial Championships, Kasper Asgreen
 Time Trial Championships, Josef Černý
 Time Trial Championships, João Almeida
 Road Race Championships, Rémi Cavagna
 Points classification, Tour de France, Mark Cavendish
Stage 1, Julian Alaphilippe
Stages 4, 6, 10 & 13, Mark Cavendish
Stages 2 & 5 Tour de Wallonie, Fabio Jakobsen
Stage 1 Tour de l'Ain, Álvaro Hodeg
 Overall Tour de Pologne, João Almeida
Stages 2 & 4, João Almeida
Stage 6 (ITT), Rémi Cavagna
 Overall Danmark Rundt, Remco Evenepoel
Stages 3 & 5 (ITT), Remco Evenepoel
 Points classification, Vuelta a España, Fabio Jakobsen
Stages 4, 8 & 16, Fabio Jakobsen
Stage 13, Florian Sénéchal
Grote Prijs Marcel Kint, Álvaro Hodeg
Druivenkoers Overijse, Remco Evenepoel
Brussels Cycling Classic, Remco Evenepoel
Stage 7 Tour of Britain, Yves Lampaert
 Overall Tour de Luxembourg, João Almeida
Stage 1, João Almeida
Stage 4 (ITT), Mattia Cattaneo
Stage 1 Okolo Slovenska, Álvaro Hodeg
Stage 2 Okolo Slovenska, Jannik Steimle
Primus Classic, Florian Sénéchal
Gooikse Pijl, Fabio Jakobsen
World Road Race Championships, Julian Alaphilippe
Eurométropole Tour, Fabio Jakobsen
Münsterland Giro, Mark Cavendish
Coppa Bernocchi, Remco Evenepoel

2022 – Quick-Step Alpha Vinyl Team

Stage 1 Volta a la Comunitat Valenciana, Remco Evenepoel
Stage 2 & 5 Volta a la Comunitat Valenciana, Fabio Jakobsen
Stage 2 Tour of Oman, Mark Cavendish
Stage 4 Tour of Oman, Fausto Masnada
 Overall Volta ao Algarve, Remco Evenepoel
Stages 1 & 3 Volta ao Algarve, Fabio Jakobsen
Stage 4 (ITT), Remco Evenepoel
Stage 2 UAE Tour, Mark Cavendish
Kuurne–Brussels–Kuurne, Fabio Jakobsen
Stage 2 Paris–Nice, Fabio Jakobsen
Milano–Torino, Mark Cavendish
Stage 1 Settimana Internazionale di Coppi e Bartali, Mauro Schmid
Stage 5 Volta a Catalunya, Ethan Vernon
Stage 5 Settimana Internazionale di Coppi e Bartali, Josef Černý
Stage 7 Volta a Catalunya, Andrea Bagioli
Stage 2 Tour of the Basque Country, Julian Alaphilippe
Liège–Bastogne–Liège, Remco Evenepoel
Stage 3 Giro d'Italia, Mark Cavendish
Stage 2 & 3 Tour de Hongrie, Fabio Jakobsen
 Overall Tour of Norway, Remco Evenepoel
Stages 1, 3 & 5 Tour of Norway, Remco Evenepoel
Elfstedenronde, Fabio Jakobsen
 Overall Tour of Belgium, Mauro Schmid
Stage 3 (ITT), Yves Lampaert
Stage 5, Fabio Jakobsen
Stage 8 Tour de Suisse, Remco Evenepoel
 Time Trial Championships, Remco Evenepoel
 Road Race Championships, Florian Sénéchal
 Road Race Championships, Mark Cavendish
Stage 1 (ITT) Tour de France, Yves Lampaert
Stage 2 Tour de France, Fabio Jakobsen
Stage 1 Tour de Wallonie, Julian Alaphilippe
Stage 4 Tour de Wallonie, Davide Ballerini
Clásica de San Sebastián, Remco Evenepoel
 Overall Vuelta a España, Remco Evenepoel
Stages 10 (ITT) & 18, Remco Evenepoel
 Overall Okolo Slovenska, Josef Černý
Prologue & Stage 1, Ethan Vernon
Kampioenschap van Vlaanderen, Fabio Jakobsen
World Road Race Championships, Remco Evenepoel
Coppa Bernocchi, Davide Ballerini

2023 – Soudal–Quick-Step

Stage 2 Vuelta a San Juan, Fabio Jakobsen
Trofeo Palma, Ethan Vernon
Stage 1 Tour of Oman, Tim Merlier
Figueira Champions Classic, Casper Pedersen
Stage 5 Tour of Oman, Mauri Vansevenant
 Overall UAE Tour, Remco Evenepoel
Stage 1 & 6 UAE Tour, Tim Merlier
Stage 2 (TTT), Soudal Quick-Step
Ardèche Classic, Julian Alaphilippe
Stage 1 Paris–Nice, Tim Merlier
Stage 2 Tirreno–Adriatico, Fabio Jakobsen

Supplementary statistics

Notes

References

Wins
Quick
Belgium sport-related lists